The discography of M-Flo features nine studio albums, nine compilation albums, one live album and 25 singles. These were released on Labsoul Records and Avex Group independent label Rhythm Republic in 1998, and from 1999 onwards released through Rhythm Zone.

Studio albums

Compilation albums

Outside collaborations compilation albums

Remix albums

Non-stop remix albums

Live album

Tribute albums

Singles

As a lead artist

As a collaborating artist

Promotional singles

Other appearances

Sampled songs

Sampled M-Flo songs

Video albums

Notes

References

M-Flo
Discographies of Japanese artists
Rhythm and blues discographies